Clémentine is a small satellite built by Alcatel Space (now Thales) for the French DGA, ostensibly "to study the Earth's radio-electrical environment from space."

It is a successor to the Cerise satellite.

References

Satellites of France
Spacecraft launched in 1999
Spacecraft launched by Ariane rockets
Derelict satellites orbiting Earth
Signals intelligence
Military equipment introduced in the 1990s